The 2016–17 Scottish Challenge Cup, known as the IRN-BRU Cup due to sponsorship reasons, was the 26th season of the competition. The tournament took on a different format from previous seasons with a total of 54 teams participating. It was the first season with two clubs from both Northern Ireland and Wales competing alongside the 30 members of the 2016–17 Scottish Championship, 2016–17 Scottish League One and 2016–17 Scottish League Two, four teams from the 2016–17 Highland Football League and four from the 2016–17 Lowland Football League as well as the Under-20 teams of the teams competing in the 2016–17 Scottish Premiership.

The defending champions, Rangers, who defeated Peterhead in the 2016 final, did not compete in the competition due to their promotion to the Scottish Premiership. Irn Bru replaced Petrofac as the main sponsor of the competition in June 2016.

Format

First round
The draw for the first round was made on 23 June at Hampden Park. The 28 teams entering at this stage were separated into 4 regional pools. This was to ensure that U20s teams were not drawn against each other and that teams from the Highland and Lowland Leagues were not drawn against each other.

North Section

Draw  and seeding
Teams from Pool A will be drawn against teams from Pool B. Teams in Bold qualified for the Second round.

Matches

South Section

Draw and seeding
Teams from Pool C will be drawn against teams from Pool D. Teams in Bold qualified for the Second round.

Matches

Second round
The draw for the second round was made at 12:30pm on Thursday, 4 August at Hampden Park and streamed live on Periscope by Irn-Bru's football Twitter account. The 14 teams advancing from the first round were joined by the top two teams from the 2015–16 Scottish League Two and the eight teams placed third to 10th from the 2015–16 Scottish League One.

The second round ties will take place on Tuesday 16 or Wednesday 17 August 2016.

North Section

Draw and seeding
Teams from Pot A will be drawn against teams from Pot B. Teams in Bold advanced to the third round.

Matches

South Section

Draw and seeding
Teams from Pot C will be drawn against teams from Pot D. Teams in Italics were not known at the time of the draw. Teams in Bold advanced to the third round.

Matches

Third round

The draw for the third round was made on Thursday 18 August at 1pm at The Kelpies and was streamed live on Periscope by Irn-Bru's football Twitter account. The 12 teams advancing from the second round will be joined by the ten teams from the 2016–17 Scottish Championship and the bottom two teams from the 2015–16 Scottish Championship.

The third round ties took place on Saturday 3 and Sunday 4 September 2016.

North Section

Draw and seeding
Teams from Pot A will be drawn against teams from Pot B. Teams in Bold advanced to the fourth round.

Matches

South Section

Draw and seeding
Teams from Pot C will be drawn against teams from Pot D. Teams in Bold advanced to the fourth round.

Matches

Fourth round

The 12 teams advancing from the third round were to be joined by the four teams that finished first and second in the 2015–16 NIFL Premiership and the 2015–16 Welsh Premier League.

Draw and seeding

The draw for the fourth round was made at the Oriam National Performance Centre, Heriot Watt University in Edinburgh on Tuesday, 6 September at 12pm. The draw was made by John Hartson and IRN-BRU super fan Michael Douglas. There was no seeding for the draw however, teams for Northern Ireland and Wales could not be drawn against each other. As a result they were placed into two separate pots (A and B) before being drawn against the remaining Scottish teams (Pot C). The Welsh teams were drawn first followed by the Northern Irish teams with one of each playing at home and one away.

Teams in Bold advanced to the quarter-finals.

Matches

Replay

Notes

Quarter-finals

Draw
The draw for the quarter-finals was made at the Titan Crane on the River Clyde in Clydebank on Monday, 10 October at 2pm and was streamed live on Periscope by Irn-Bru's football Twitter account. The draw was made by former Dundee United and Scotland striker Kevin Gallacher and Rio 2016 silver medallist Dan Wallace. There was no seeding for the draw however, as with the previous round, teams from Northern Ireland and Wales, should they qualify, would not be drawn against each other. The ties took place on the weekend of 12 and 13 November.

Teams in Bold advanced to the semi-finals.

Matches

Semi-finals

Draw
The draw for the semi-finals was made at the Toryglen Regional Football Centre in Glasgow on Monday, 14 November and streamed live on Periscope by Irn-Bru's football Twitter account. The draw was made by former Manchester City and Scotland striker Paul Dickov and current Scotland and Hibernian striker Abi Harrison. There was no seeding for the draw and the ties are due to take place on the weekend of 18 and 19 February 2017.

Teams in Bold advanced to the final.

Matches

Final

Statistics

Top goalscorers

Player of the Round
The Golden Ball Award is a 'Player of the Round' award given to the player who is adjudged to have had the best performance of that round out of all the players in teams left competing in that round of the competition. The winner is voted for by supporters from a chosen short-list of players on the official Irn-Bru Football twitter page.

Broadcasting rights
The domestic broadcasting rights for the competition are held jointly by BBC Alba, S4C (for matches involving Welsh teams) and subscription channel Premier Sports. Prior to the re-format in the 2016–17 season, BBC Alba had exclusive rights.

The following matches are to be broadcast live on UK television:

References

External links
Scottish Challenge Cup at the Scottish Professional Football League

Scottish Challenge Cup seasons
Challenge Cup
3